Grassroots Group of Second Class Citizens was a political organization of feminist women created in the early 1980s to undertake non-violent direct action tactics to raise awareness for the need of an Equal Rights Amendment. The group also advocated for reproductive rights and lasted throughout the 1980s.

Actions at the Illinois State House 
Grassroots Group of Second Class Citizens were especially known for their direct actions at the Illinois State House in 1982. One of the grandmothers of a founder, Mary Lee Sargent, was a suffragist. Sargent co-founded this group while teaching at Parkland Community College in Illinois. In 1982, the ERA was set to expire and both pro and anti-ERA groups descended upon the Capitol in Illinois to lobby state legislators. Members of the Grassroots Group of Second Class Citizens were often referred to as a chain gang because they had chained themselves together inside the capitol.

Day of Rebellion for ERA 
One of the most notable actions undertaken by Grassroots Group of Second Class Citizens was known as their Day of Rebellion for the ERA on June 3, 1982. That day, 17 women chained themselves inside the Illinois State Capitol. According to the Macon Telegraph, "When asked if they were worried the sit-in might alienate ERA supporters, Mary Lee Sargent...said, 'It's too late for that...we're here to step up the confrontation." Sargent noted this action had connections to the militant actions of the women's suffrage movement. She said, "It's our willingness to put our bodies out here, to be a spectacle and to be laughed at by people...but to face people directly."

The Grassroots Group of Second Class Citizens refused to leave the Capitol and members spent four nights in jail. The group then sprayed animal blood inside the capitol to symbolize the death of the ERA. They were ordered to pay more than $2,000 in cleanup fees. A photo of the women in chains appeared in Life magazine in 1982.

Fast for the ERA 
Grassroots Group of Second Class Citizens were politically active at the same time and place when another group of women fasted for the ERA in Illinois in 1982. Both groups expressed solidarity for one another in the press. Fasters included longtime women's rights activists Zoe Nicholson and Sonia Johnson.

Later years 
After the failure of the ERA campaign, Grassroots Group for Second Class Citizens continued to be politically active as they advocated for a variety of feminist causes including for abortion rights. In 1982, the group undertook an action where they posed as "witches" while holding a mock trial of legislators. In 1984, Sargent ran for a seat on the Board of Trustees for the University of Illinois-Champaign. The group finally disbanded in 1993.

Members of the Grassroots Group of Second Class Citizens 
 Berenice Carroll
 Kari Alice Lynn
 Loretta Manning
 Page Mellish
 Joyce Meyer
 Caroline Plank
 Mary Lee Sargent
 Alice Weber
 Sue Yarber

See also 
 Catholics Act for ERA
 Georgia Fuller
 Sonia Johnson
 Zoe Nicholson

References 

Women's rights activists
Radical feminism
Radical feminists
Nonviolence advocates
Civil disobedience
Militant feminism
Equal Rights Amendment organizations